The Strategic Innovation Fund (SIF) is the program of Innovation, Science and Economic Development Canada designed to support the "Canadian innovation ecosystem," which includes providing "funding to innovative sectors" such as "advanced manufacturing, agri-food, clean technology, clean resources, digital industries, and health and biosciences." The SIF covers all sectors of the Canadian economy and is available to both for-profit and not-for profit organizations.

It supports those large-scale projects that help position Canada's interests in the global knowledge-based economy, promoting the long-term competitiveness of Canadian industries, clean growth, and the "advancement of Canada's strategic technological advantage." With a single, streamlined fund, it provides businesses with access to a simpler application process, more timely processing, and responsive assistance.

History
Funded in the March 2017 Canadian federal budget and slated to last only five years, the SIF was introduced by Prime Minister Justin Trudeau and his 29th Canadian Ministry in July 2017. It was marketed as "A Simpler, More Flexible Tool to Grow Canada’s Economy," and accomplished this by "consolidat[ing] and simplify[ing] existing business innovation programming, in particular the Strategic Aerospace and Defence Initiative, Technology Demonstration Program, Automotive Innovation Fund and Automotive Supplier Innovation Program."

Since the 2018 Canadian federal budget, the SIF now only provides funds in chunks of over $10 million. In June that year, the SIF was the mechanism of support for the steel and aluminum industries of Canada when the Trump Administration placed customs duties on them.

In October 2018, Canadian Minister of Innovation, Science and Economic Development, Navdeep Bains, announced that the SIF would invest C$49.3 million in General Fusion. In December 2019, General Fusion raised $65 million in Series E equity financing from Singapore’s Temasek Holdings, Bezos Expeditions, and Chrysalix, concurrently with another $38 million from the SIF. The firm said that the funds would permit it to begin the design, construction, and operation of its Fusion Demonstration Plant.

On 20 March 2020, the Canadian government announced a plan to ramp up production of medical equipment, switching assembly lines to produce ventilators, masks, and other personal protective gear. Companies would be able to access funds through the SIF. Trudeau stated that Canadian medical supply firms Thornhill Medical, Medicom, and Spartan Bioscience were looking to expand production. To address shortages and supply-chain disruption, Canada passed emergency legislation that waived patent protection, giving government-selected companies or organizations the right to produce patented products without permission from the patent holder. According to the Bains, "the country's entire industrial policy will be refocused to prioritize the fight against COVID-19."

Projects 
Recent projects of SIF, include:

 Natural Products Canada
 ArcelorMittal Dofasco G.P.
 Pratt & Whitney Canada
 Bell Textron Canada
 CAE Inc.

Primary sector of company in bold ("x")

Medical Countermeasures projects 
In the wake of the COVID-19 pandemic, the SIF was designated by the Canadian government in March 2020 to deliver the Medical Countermeasures (MCM) initiative and was given authority to invest $792 million to fund clinical trials and manufacturing capacity at scale. The MCM funding stream is divided into three types of projects: vaccines, therapies, and biomanufacturing projects.

References

Innovation, Science and Economic Development Canada
Government in Canada
Society of Canada
Government aid programs
Federal assistance in Canada